The Ambassador of Australia to Norway is an officer of the Australian Department of Foreign Affairs and Trade and the head of the Embassy of the Commonwealth of Australia to the Kingdom of Norway. The Ambassador resides in Copenhagen, Denmark. The current ambassador, since May 2017, is MaryEllen Miller.

List of ambassadors

See also
Australia–Norway relations

References

External links
Australian Embassy, Norway

 
Norway
Australia